Limnocharidae is a family of mites in the order Trombidiformes. There are at least 4 genera and about 12 described species in Limnocharidae.

Genera
These four genera belong to the family Limnocharidae:
 Austrolimnochares Harvey, 1998
 Limnochares Latreille, 1796
 Rhyncholimnochares Lundblad, 1936
 † Neolimnochares Lundblad, 1937

References

Further reading

 
 
 
 

Trombidiformes
Acari families